John Mosman may refer to:
 John Mosman (goldsmith)
 John Mosman (apothecary)